2020 Tipsport Premier League is an ongoing darts tournament - the first edition in its history. The tournament was inspired by Premier League Darts, which is organized by the professional darts organisation, PDC. The idea to play this tournament was created during the world-wide pandemic of COVID-19. The meaning of the competition is, apart from the fight against the coronavirus, also an introduction of more Czech players to the general public. For players it is a great opportunity to practice and compete during this hard time and to gain much needed experience for future years of their careers. The winner of the first edition was Vítězslav Sedlák, who defeated in the final 10 - 6 Alexander Mašek.

Format 
The format of the tournament is very similar to Premier League Darts, which is organised by the PDC. The main difference is the absence of a draw, each match has a winner and a loser. Each match starts with a bulls-eye shootout, which decides who will start the match. The first player to throw on the bulls-eye is the one that is listed as the first in the schedule. Values of the shootout are: 50 - the red middle; 25 - the green middle; outside. If both players score the same value, the shootout continues in the reversed order until the decision.

Phase 1:  In the first phase of the competition (9 rounds), ten players play each other. Phase 1 matches have a maximum of eleven legs, allowing for the winner being first to six. At the end of Phase 1, the two bottom players are eliminated from the competition.

Phase 2: In the second phase of the competition (7 rounds), eight remaining players play again each other. Phase 2 matches have a maximum of thirteen legs, allowing for the winner being first to seven. At the end of Phase 2, the bottom four players in the league table are eliminated from the competition. The first four players in the league table qualify for the Play-off.

Play-off: The top four players in the league table contest the two knockout semi-finals with 1st playing 4th and 2nd playing 3rd. The semi-finals are first to 10 legs (best of 19). The two winning semi-finalists meet in the final which is also best of 19.

Venues 
Due to the coronavirus outbreak and regulations from the government of the Czech Republic, all players will play from their home. All players have a webcam prepared in their home environment, through which it is possible to watch every thrown dart. After each throw, players announce their score. Viewers see both dartboards at the same time, along with the scoreboard which is powered by DartConnect.

Prize money 
The first edition of the tournament does not include any prize money for players. On the contrary, the tournament has a charity meaning. For every thrown "180", the official partner of 2020 Tipsport Premier League, the company Tipsport, donates 500 CZK for purchase of medical equipment (face masks, ventilators etc.) for the fight against the coronavirus.

Players
For the first edition of Tipsport Premier League, 10 players have been chosen in advance including the former PDC World Youth Championship runner-up and JDC World Darts Championship runner-up, Adam Gawlas and the former PDC World Cup of Darts national team member, Pavel Jirkal. Other players have experience from international tournaments and are the best players in Czech Republic. The current Czech number one, Karel Sedláček, though invited, could not compete due to the contract obligations to PDC.

League stage

7. April - round 1 (phase 1) 
(best of 11 legs)

8. April- round 2 (phase 1) 
(best of 11 legs)

9. April - round 3 (phase 1) 
(best of 11 legs)

15. April - round 4 (phase 1) 
(best of 11 legs)

16. April - round 5 (phase 1) 
(best of 11 legs)

22. April - round 6 (phase 1) 
(best of 11 legs)

23. April - round 7 (phase 1) 
(best of 11 legs)

29. April - round 8 (phase 1) 
(best of 11 legs)

30. April - round 9 (phase 1) 
(best of 11 legs)

6. May - round 10 (phase 2) 
(best of 13 legs)

7. May - round 11 (phase 2) 
(best of 13 legs)

13. May - round 12 (phase 2) 
(best of 13 legs)

14. May - round 13 (phase 2) 
(best of 13 legs)

20. May - round 14 (phase 2) 
(best of 13 legs)

21. May - round 15 (phase 2) 
(best of 13 legs)

27. May - round 16 (phase 2) 
(best of 13 legs)

Playoff - 28. May

Table and streaks

Table 
After the first nine rounds in phase 1, the two bottom players in the table are eliminated. In phase 2, the eight remaining players play in a single match on each of the seven nights. The top four players then compete in the knockout semi-finals and final on the playoff night.

One point is awarded for a win, zero points for a loss. When players are tied on points, the following rules are applied:

 Points difference (one point is awarded for a win)
 Leg difference
 Number of legs won against the throw
 The highest average in a match
 9 darts shootout

(Q) = Qualified For The Playoffs ; (E) = Eliminated From Playoff Contention

Streaks

Positions by Round

References 

Darts in the Czech Republic
Sports competitions in the Czech Republic
2020 in Czech sport
2020 in darts